Otto Funke (October 27, 1828 – August 17, 1879) was a German physiologist born in Chemnitz.

He studied in Leipzig and Heidelberg, and in 1852, he became a lecturer of physiology at the University of Leipzig. In 1853, he became an associate professor to the medical faculty at Leipzig, and in 1860, a professor of physiology at the University of Freiburg. One of his better known students at Leipzig was the physiologist Karl Ewald Konstantin Hering (1834–1918).

In 1851, Otto Funke was the first scientist to successfully crystallize hemoglobin, which he first called Blutfarbstoff.  This work was a precursor to Felix Hoppe-Seyler's important studies of hemoglobin. Funke also performed research of blood formation in the spleen, and investigations into the effects of curare.

Selected publications 
 Lehrbuch der Physiologie (7. Aufl. von Grünhagen, Hamburg 1884) 
 Atlas der physiologischen Chemie (Leipzig 1853, 2. Aufl. 1858), Supplement to Carl Lehmann's Lehrbuch der physiologischen Chemie 
 Kapitel über den Tastsinn und die Gemeingefühle. In: Ludimar Hermann's Handbuch der Physiologie (Bd. 3, Leipzig 1880)

References 

 A NASA Recipe For Protein Crystallography
 Parts of the article are based on an equivalent article at the German Wikipedia.

1828 births
1879 deaths
People from Chemnitz
German physiologists
Academic staff of the University of Freiburg
Academic staff of Leipzig University